Richard Allen Boone (June 18, 1917 – January 10, 1981) was an American actor who starred in over 50 films and was notable for his roles in Westerns, including his starring role in the television series Have Gun – Will Travel.

Early life
Boone was born in Los Angeles, California, the middle child of Cecile (née Beckerman) and Kirk E. Boone, a corporate lawyer and fourth great-grandson of Squire Boone, frontiersman Daniel Boone's brother. His mother was Jewish, the daughter of immigrants from Russia.

Richard Boone graduated from Hoover High School in Glendale, California. He attended Stanford University in Palo Alto, California, where he was a member of Theta Xi fraternity. He dropped out of Stanford prior to graduation and then worked as an oil rigger, bartender, painter, and writer. In 1941, Boone joined the United States Navy and served on three ships in the Pacific during World War II, seeing combat as an aviation ordnanceman, aircrewman, and tail gunner on Grumman TBF Avenger torpedo bombers, and ended his service with the rank of petty officer first class.

Acting career

Early training
In his youth, Boone had attended the San Diego Army and Navy Academy in Carlsbad, California, where he was introduced to theatre under the tutelage of Virginia Atkinson.

After the war, Boone used the G.I. Bill to study acting at the Actors Studio in New York.

Broadway
"Serious" and "methodical", Boone debuted on the Broadway theatrical scene in 1947 with Medea, starring Judith Anderson and John Gielgud; it ran for 214 performances. He was then in a production of Macbeth (1948).
Boone appeared in a short-lived TV series based on the play The Front Page (1949–50), and on anthology series such as Actors Studio and Suspense.

He returned to Broadway in The Man (1950), directed by Martin Ritt, with Dorothy Gish; it ran for 92 performances.

Elia Kazan used Boone to feed lines to an actress for a film screen-test done for director Lewis Milestone. Milestone was not impressed with the actress, but he was impressed enough with Boone's voice to summon him to Hollywood, where he was given a seven-year contract with Fox.

20th Century Fox
In 1950, Boone made his screen debut as a Marine officer in Milestone's Halls of Montezuma (1951).  Fox used him in military parts in Call Me Mister (1951) and The Desert Fox: The Story of Rommel (1951). He had bigger roles in Red Skies of Montana (1952), Return of the Texan (1952), Kangaroo (1952) (directed by Milestone), and Way of a Gaucho (1952).

Kazan directed him in Man on a Tightrope (1953) and he had good parts in Vicki (1953) and City of Bad Men (1953)

In 1953, he played Pontius Pilate in The Robe, the first Cinemascope film. He had only one scene in the film, in which he gives instructions to Richard Burton, who plays the centurion ordered to crucify Christ. Boone also appeared in the second Cinemascope film, Beneath the 12-Mile Reef (1953).

Boone made two films for Panoramic, which distributed through Fox: The Siege at Red River (1954) and The Raid (1954). He then left the studio.

Medic
During the filming of Halls of Montezuma, he befriended Jack Webb, who was then producing and starring in Dragnet. Boone appeared in the film version of Dragnet (1954).

Webb was preparing a series about a doctor for NBC. From 1954–56, Boone became a familiar face in the lead role of that medical drama, titled Medic, and in 1955 received an Emmy nomination for Best Actor Starring in a Regular Series.

While on Medic, Boone continued to appear in films and guest-star on television shows. He was cast in Westerns such as Ten Wanted Men (1955) with Randolph Scott, Man Without a Star (1955) with Kirk Douglas, Robbers' Roost (1955) with George Montgomery, Battle Stations (1955) with John Lund, Star in the Dust (1956) with John Agar, and Away All Boats (1956) with Jeff Chandler.

He also guest-starred on General Electric Theater, Matinee Theatre (a production of Wuthering Heights where he played Heathcliff), Frontier, Lux Video Theatre, The Ford Television Theatre, Studio One in Hollywood, and Climax!.

Boone had one of his best roles in The Tall T (1957) with Randolph Scott. He co-starred with Eleanor Parker in Lizzie (1957) and was a villain in The Garment Jungle (1957).

Have Gun – Will Travel

Boone's next television series, Have Gun – Will Travel, made him a national star because of his role as Paladin, the intelligent and sophisticated, but tough gun-for-hire in the late 19th-century American West. The show had first been offered to actor Randolph Scott, who turned it down and gave the script to Boone while they were making  Ten Wanted Men. The show ran from 1957 to 1963, with Boone receiving more Emmy nominations in 1959 and 1960.

During the show's run, Boone starred in the film I Bury the Living (1958) and appeared on Broadway in 1959, starring as Abraham Lincoln in The Rivalry, which ran for 81 performances.

He occasionally did other acting appearances such as episodes of Playhouse 90 and The United States Steel Hour and TV movie The Right Man (1960). He had a cameo as Sam Houston in The Alamo (1960), a starring role in A Thunder of Drums (1961) and narrated a TV version of John Brown's Body.

Boone was an occasional guest panelist and also a mystery guest on What's My Line?, the Sunday-night CBS-TV quiz show. On that show, he talked with host John Charles Daly about their days working together on the TV show The Front Page.

The Richard Boone Show
Boone had his own television anthology, The Richard Boone Show. Although it aired only from 1963 to 1964, he received his fourth Emmy nomination for it in 1964 along with The Danny Kaye Show and The Dick Van Dyke Show. The Richard Boone Show won a Golden Globe for Best Show in 1964.

Hawaii

After the end of the run of his weekly show, Boone and his family moved to Honolulu, Hawaii.

He returned to the mainland to appear in films such as Rio Conchos (1964), The War Lord (1965) with Charlton Heston, Hombre (1967) with Paul Newman, and an episode of Cimarron Strip. The latter was the first time he guest-starred on someone else's show and he did it as a favor for the director, friend Lamont Johnson. "It's harder and harder to do your best work on TV," he said.

In 1965, he came in third in the Laurel Award for Rio Conchos in Best Action Performance; Sean Connery won first place with Goldfinger and Burt Lancaster won second place with The Train. 

While he was living on Oahu, Boone helped persuade Leonard Freeman to film Hawaii Five-O exclusively in Hawaii. Prior to that, Freeman had planned to do "establishing" location shots in Hawaii, but principal production in Southern California. Boone and others convinced Freeman that the islands could offer all necessary support for a major TV series and would provide an authenticity otherwise unobtainable.

Freeman, impressed by Boone's love of Hawaii, offered him the role of Steve McGarrett; Boone turned it down, however, and the role went to Jack Lord, who shared Boone's enthusiasm for the state, which Freeman considered vital. Coincidentally, Lord had appeared alongside Boone in the first episode of Have Gun – Will Travel, titled "Three Bells to Perdido". 

At the time, Boone had shot a pilot for CBS called Kona Coast (1968), which he hoped CBS would adopt as a series ("I really don't want to do another series," he said "but I've been battling for three years to get production going in Hawaii and if a series will do it, I'll do it."), but the network went instead only with Hawaii Five-O. Kona Coast – which Boone co produced – was released theatrically.

Films
Boone then focused on films: The Night of the Following Day (1969) with Marlon Brando, The Arrangement (1969) with Douglas for Elia Kazan, The Kremlin Letter (1970) for John Huston,  and Big Jake (1971) with John Wayne.

Boone did some TV movies, In Broad Daylight (1971), Deadly Harvest (1972), and Goodnight, My Love (1972). Around this time he moved to Florida.

Hec Ramsey
In the early 1970s, Boone starred in the short-lived TV series Hec Ramsey, which Jack Webb produced for Mark VII Limited Productions, and which was about a turn-of-the-20th-century Western-style police detective who preferred to use his brain and criminal forensic skills instead of his gun. The character Ramsey's back story had him as a frontier lawman and gunman in his younger days.  Older now, he was the deputy chief of police of a small city in Oklahoma, still a skilled shooter, and carrying a short-barreled Colt Single Action Army revolver.  Boone said to an interviewer in 1972, "You know, Hec Ramsey is a lot like Paladin, only fatter." This quote was often misinterpreted to mean that Hec Ramsey was a sequel to Have Gun – Will Travel, when it actually was not.

Israel 
Boone starred in the 1970 film Madron (1970), the first Israeli-produced film shot outside Israel, set in the American West of the 1800s. In that year, he  accepted an invitation from Israel's Commerce Ministry to provide the Israeli film industry with "Hollywood know-how." In 1979, he received an award from Israeli Prime Minister Yitzhak Rabin "for his contribution to Israeli cinema."

Final performances
He starred in The Great Niagara (1974) and Against a Crooked Sky (1975) and supported John Wayne a third time, in Wayne's final film, The Shootist (1976). In the mid-1970s, Boone returned to The Neighborhood Playhouse in New York City, where he had once studied acting, to teach.

Boone did God's Gun (1976) with Leif Garrett, Lee Van Cleef, and Jack Palance. He appeared in The Last Dinosaur (1977) and The Big Sleep (1978), and provided the character voice of the dragon Smaug in the 1977 animated film version of J. R. R. Tolkien's The Hobbit.

Boone's last appearances were in Winter Kills (1979) and The Bushido Blade (1979).

Personal life
Boone was married three times: to Jane Hopper (1937–1940), Mimi Kelly (1949–1950), and Claire McAloon (from 1951 until his death).  His son with McAloon, Peter Boone, worked as a child actor in several Have Gun – Will Travel episodes.  

In 1963, Boone was injured in a car accident.

Boone moved to St. Augustine, Florida, from Hawaii in 1970 and worked with the annual local production of Cross and Sword, when he was not acting on television or in movies, until shortly before his death in 1981. In the last year of his life, Boone was appointed Florida's cultural ambassador.

During the 1970s, he wrote a newspaper column, called "It Seems to Me", for a small, free publication called The Town and Traveler. Some paper copies are in his biographical file at the St. Augustine Historical Society. He also gave acting lectures at Flagler College in 1972–1973.

Death
Boone died at his home in St. Augustine, Florida, due to complications from throat cancer. His ashes were scattered in the Pacific Ocean off Hawaii.

Filmography

Film

 Halls of Montezuma (1951) as  Lt. Col. Gilfillan
 Call Me Mister (1951) as  Mess Sergeant
 The Desert Fox: The Story of Rommel (1951) as Captain Hermann Aldinger
 Red Skies of Montana (1952) as Richard 'Dick' Dryer 
 Return of the Texan (1952) as Rod Murray
 Kangaroo (1952) as John W. Gamble
 Way of a Gaucho (1952) as Major Salinas
 Pony Soldier (1952) (uncredited)
 Man on a Tightrope (1953) as Krofta
 Vicki (1953) as Lt. Ed Cornell
 The Robe (1953) as Pontius Pilate
 City of Bad Men (1953) as John Ringo
 Beneath the 12-Mile Reef (1953) as Thomas Rhys
 Siege at Red River (1954) as Brett Manning
 The Raid (1954) as Capt. Lionel Foster
 Dragnet (1954) as Captain Jim Hamilton
 Ten Wanted Men (1955) as Wick Campbell
 Man Without a Star (1955) as Steve Miles
 Robbers' Roost (1955) as Hank Hays
 The Big Knife (1955) as Narrator (voice, uncredited)
 Battle Stations (1956) as The Captain
 Star in the Dust (1956) as Sam Hall
 Away All Boats (1956) as Lieut. Fraser
 The Tall T (1957) as Frank Usher
 Lizzie (1957) as Dr. Neal Wright
 The Garment Jungle (1957) as Artie Ravidge
 I Bury the Living (1958) as Robert Kraft
 Ocean's 11 (1960) as Minister (voice, uncredited)
 The Alamo (1960) as General Sam Houston
 A Thunder of Drums (1961) as Captain Stephen Maddocks
 Rio Conchos (1964) as James Lassiter
 The War Lord (1965) as Bors
 Hombre (1967) as Grimes
 Kona Coast (1968) as Capt. Sam Moran
 The Night of the Following Day (1968) as Leer
 The Arrangement (1969) as Sam Arness
 The Kremlin Letter (1970) as Ward
 Madron (1970) as Madron
 Big Jake (1971) as John Fain
 The Singing Filipina (1971) as Himself
 Against a Crooked Sky (1975) as Russian
 Diamante Lobo (1976) as The Sheriff
 The Shootist (1976) as Mike Sweeney
 The Last Dinosaur (1977) as Maston Thrust Jr.
 The Big Sleep (1978) as Lash Canino
 Winter Kills (1979) as Keifitz
 The Bushido Blade (1981) as Commodore Matthew C. Perry (final film role)

TV

 Actors Studio: 3 episodes (1949–1950)
 The Front Page: 10 episodes (CBS, 1949–1950)
 Suspense: episode "Photo Finish", as Mercer (1950)
 Medic: 59 episodes, as Dr. Konrad Styner (1954–1956)
 Climax!: 4 episodes, various roles (1955–1957)
 Matinee Theatre: episode "Wuthering Height", Heathcliff (1955)
 General Electric Theater: episode "Love Is Eternal", Abraham Lincoln (1955)
  Lux Video Theatre: episode "The Hunted", Saxon (1955)
 The Ford Television Theatre, Catch at Straws, local press man (1956)
 Lux Video Theatre: episode "A House of His Own", Vincent Giel (1956)
 Frontier: episode "The Salt War", Everett Brayer (1956)
 Studio One in Hollywood: episode "Dead of Noon", as John Wesley Hardin (1957)
 Have Gun – Will Travel: all 225 episodes, as Paladin, and Smoke,  (1957–1963)
 Playhouse 90: 3 episodes, in various roles, (1958–1960)
 The United States Steel Hour: 2 episodes in various roles, (1959–1960)
 The Right Man (TV movie): as Abraham Lincoln (1960)
 The Richard Boone Show: 25 episodes, in various roles, (1963–1964)
 Cimarron Strip: episode "The Roarer", as Sergeant Bill Disher (1967)
 The Mark Waters Story (1969)
 In Broad Daylight: as Tony Chappel  (1971)
 Deadly Harvest: as Anton Solca (1972)
 Hec Ramsey: all 10 episodes, as Deputy Police Chief Hec Ramsey, (1972–1974)
 Goodnight, My Love: as Francis Hogan  (1972)
 The Great Niagara (TV movie): as Aaron Grant (1974)
 The Last Dinosaur (1977)
 The Hobbit: as Smaug (voice) (1977)

References

Bibliography
 Rothel, David (2001). Richard Boone: A Knight Without Armor in a Savage Land. Madison, NC: Empire Publishing,

External links

 
 
 
 Richard Boone at Virtual History
 Remembering Richard Boone, the teacher, greensburgdailynews.com; accessed September 1, 2017.

1917 births
1981 deaths
20th Century Studios contract players
20th-century American male actors
American male television actors
American people of English descent
American people of Russian-Jewish descent
United States Navy personnel of World War II
Boone family (show business)
Deaths from pneumonia in Florida
Deaths from cancer in Florida
Deaths from esophageal cancer
Male actors from Honolulu
Male actors from Los Angeles
Male Western (genre) film actors
Military personnel from Rhode Island
Neighborhood Playhouse School of the Theatre alumni
People from St. Augustine, Florida
Stanford University alumni
United States Navy non-commissioned officers
Western (genre) television actors